Telomeric repeat-binding factor 1 is a protein that in humans is encoded by the TERF1 gene.

Gene 

The human TERF1 gene is located in the chromosome 8 at 73,921,097-73,960,357 bp. Two transcripts of this gene are alternatively spliced products. The TERF1 gene is also known as TRF, PIN2 (Proteinase Inhibitor 2), TRF1, t-TRF1 and h-TRF1-AS.

Protein 

The protein structure contains a C-terminal Myb motif, a dimerization domain (TERF homology) near its N-terminus and an acidic N-terminus.

Subcellular distribution 

The cellular distribution of this DNA binding protein features the nucleoplasm, chromosomes, a telomeric region, a nuclear telomere cap complex, the cytoplasm, the spindle, the nucleus and a nucleolus and a nuclear chromosome.

Function 
TERF 1 gene encodes a telomere specific protein which is a component of the telomere's shelterin nucleoprotein complex. This protein is present at telomeres throughout the cell cycle and functions as an inhibitor of telomerase, acting in cis to limit the elongation of individual chromosome ends. It is known to protect telomeres in mammals from DNA mechanisms that are used for repair purposes and at the same time regulate the activity carried out by telomerase. The telomeric repeat binding factor 1 protein is present at telomeres, where the cells aging aspect is monitored, throughout the typical cell cycle process. The progressive loss of the telomeric ends of chromosomes is an important mechanism in the timing of human cellular aging. Telomeric Repeat Factor 1 (TRF1) is a protein that binds at telomere ends.

The protein has the ultimate use of functioning as an inhibitor of telomerase, a protein enzyme that assists in the elongation of chromosomes by the addition of sequences of TTAGGG to the end of the chromosomes. The protein acts as cis-regulatory elements in the process of limiting the ends of individual chromosomes from elongating as facilitated by telomerase and the TTAGGG sequences. The structure of the protein consists of a dimerization domain close to its amino terminus, a carboxyl terminal tail, which is the free carboxyl group that terminates the end of a protein chain and an acidic amino terminus, which is the free amine group that terminates the start of a protein.

Biological processes
The protein is also actively involved in biological processes such as the response to drug and the negative regulation of the maintenance of telomere through the process of semi-conservative replication, similar to that of cis. In addition, according to Kaplan and Christopher, the protein is also involved in the biological processes of positive regulation of the polymerization of the microtubule and negative control of the process of DNA replication. This protein is also useful in the biological process of mitosis and the positive regulation of mitosis. It positively regulates the mitotic cell cycle. The protein encoded by the TERF 1 gene is also involved in the biological process of cell division and the negative regulation of the maintenance of telomere facilitated by the enzyme telomerase.

Other than functioning as an inhibitor of the enzyme telomerase in the process of elongation of the ends of chromosomes, the protein has other functions. These functions include the binding of the protein, facilitation in the activity of protein homodimerization, the binding of DNA and facilitation in the activity of protein heterodimerization as well as the binding of the microtubule. Additionally, the protein has a molecular function of binding telomeric DNA and the double-stranded telomeric DNA. The telomeric repeat-binding factor 1 protein is also used in the binding of chromatin and the whole activity of bending of the DNA.

Clinical significance

TERF1 protein levels correlates with telomere length in colorectal cancer. Telomeres protect the chromosome from degradation by nucleases and end-to-end fusion. The progressive loss of the telomeric ends of chromosomes is an important mechanism in the timing of human cellular aging. Telomeric Repeat Factor 1 (TRF1) is a protein that binds at telomere ends.
To measure the concentrations of TRF1 and the relationships among telomere length, telomerase activity, and TRF1 levels in tumor and normal colorectal mucosa, from normal and tumoral samples of patients who underwent surgery for colorectal cancer we analyzed TRF1 protein concentration, and telomerase activity were analysed. As result high levels of TRF1 were observed in 68.7% of tumor samples, while the majority of normal samples showed negative or weak TRF1 concentrations. Among the tumor samples, telomere length was significantly associated with TRF1 protein levels. In conclusion a relationship exists between telomere length and TRF1 abundance protein in tumor samples, which means that TRF1 is an important factor in the tumor progression and maybe a diagnostic factor.

Interactions 

The TERF1 encoded protein has been shown to have interactions with the following; SALL1 (Sal-like1- Drosophila, a protein.), ABL (Abelson murine leukemia viral oncogene homolog, a protein), MAPRE2 (Microtubule-associated protein RP/EB, a protein), ATM (Ataxia telangiectasia mutated, a protein kinase), PINX1 (TERF1-interacting telomerase inhibitor 1), TINF2 (TERF1-interacting telomerase nuclear factor), TNKS2 (Tankyrase, an enzyme) and NME1 (nucleoside diphosphate kinase).In conclusion, as mentioned above, the telomeric repeat-binding factor 1 protein has most of its functions related to the binding of components and regulation of processes.

TERF1 has been shown to interact with:

 Abl gene,
 Ataxia telangiectasia mutated, 
 MAPRE1, 
 NME1, 
 PINX1 
 SALL1, 
 TINF2, 
 TNKS2,  and
 TNKS.

References

Further reading 

 
 
 
 
 
 
 
 
 
 
 
 
 
 
 
 
 
 
 

Telomere-binding proteins